The Jackson 5ive was a Saturday morning cartoon series that aired on ABC from September 11, 1971 to October 14, 1972. Produced by Rankin/Bass and Motown Productions, it is a fictionalized portrayal of the careers of Motown recording group the Jackson 5. The series was rebroadcast in syndication in 1984–85, during a period when Michael Jackson was riding a major wave of popularity as a solo artist. It also briefly re-aired in 1999 on TV Land as part of their "Super Retrovision Saturdaze" lineup. The series was animated mainly in London at the studios of Halas and Batchelor, and some animation done at Estudios Moro (Barcelona, Spain) and Topcraft (Tokyo, Japan).

Overview 
Due to high demands on the group, the roles of Jackie, Tito, Jermaine, Marlon, and Michael were played by voice actors, with records of the group's songs being used for the musical tracks of the show. The group did make some contribution to the cartoon in the form of live photographs of each member morphing into a cartoon which was shown in the title screen medley. Although the musical scenes of the cartoon were chiefly animation, an occasional live-action footage of a concert or music video of The Jackson 5 would be spliced into the cartoon series. The actual Jackson 5 also contributed to the show by posing for pictures prior to the cartoon's debut which were used as posters, newspaper clips and TV Guide spots advertising the forthcoming TV series.

Though Berry Gordy did not provide the original voice (his character was voiced by Paul Frees) nor advertised his name, his character was frequently involved as the "adult figure" to the group. R&B/Pop singer Diana Ross contributed to voice her fictionalized self in the debut episode. The premise of the show is that the Jackson Five would have adventures similar to Josie and the Pussycats, Alvin & the Chipmunks or The Partridge Family, with the unique addition being that Berry Gordy, the manager of the band in the show's universe, would come up with an idea for publicity for the band, such as having to do farm work or play a concert for the President of the United States. The series was followed by The Jacksons, a live action variety show, in 1976.

Music 
A specially recorded medley of four of the group's biggest hits at the time ("I Want You Back", "The Love You Save", "ABC" and "Mama's Pearl") served as the show's theme song. Each episode would feature two songs by The Jackson 5. The songs were derived from their albums Diana Ross Presents The Jackson 5, ABC, Maybe Tomorrow, and Third Album. For the Season 2 episodes, eight songs were derived from Michael Jackson's album Got to Be There and two songs from The Jackson 5 album Lookin' Through the Windows.

Pets 
Because Michael Jackson owned many pets in real life, a few pets were added as extra characters to the cartoon. They included Michael's pet mice, Ray and Charles (alluding to singer Ray Charles, one of his idols), and his pet snake Rosey the Crusher. Other than the mice squeaking, the pets never spoke, but usually either attributed to assistance, mischief or joining the Jackson brothers in performances on the show

Laugh track 

Like most 1970s-era Saturday morning cartoon series, The Jackson 5ive contained an adult laugh track. Rankin-Bass experimented with creating their own laugh track, a practice Hanna-Barbera had implemented in 1971. This was done to avoid paying large fees to Charley Douglass, who edited laugh tracks onto the majority of network television shows at the time. Like Hanna-Barbera, Rankin/Bass isolated several snippets of canned chuckles from Douglass’ library, and inserted them onto the soundtrack. The laughs initially consisted of only loud eruptions; mild jokes received unnatural bouts of laughter, while other times, the laughter would erupt mid-sentence.

The studio had improved the process by the second season, using more modulated laughs culled from Douglass's 1971-1972 library. Laughs did not erupt mid-sentence like the first season and were better timed by Rankin/Bass sound engineers. The improved technique was also utilized for the sister series The Osmonds. Unlike Hanna-Barbera's laugh track, Rankin/Bass provided a larger variety of laughs.

Rankin/Bass ceased using laugh tracks after The Jackson 5ive and The Osmonds both ended their original runs.

Cast 
 Paul Frees as The Jackson 5's producer
 Donald Fullilove as Michael Jackson
 Edmund Sylvers as Marlon Jackson
 Joel Cooper as Jermaine Jackson
 Mike Martinez as Tito Jackson
 Craig Grandy as Jackie Jackson
 Diana Ross as herself (pilot episode only)

Episodes

Season 1 (1971–72)

Season 2 (1972) 
This season was billed as The New Jackson 5ive Show.

Home media
On January 15, 2013, Classic Media released The Jackson 5ive: The Complete Animated Series on DVD and Blu-ray in Region 1 for the very first time. The 2-disc set features all 23 episodes of the series. For the remastered print (The Jackson 5ive: The Complete Animated Series), the mono soundtrack was replaced by the 5.1 surround soundtrack in the songs, the rest of the scenes kept the mono soundtrack. The laugh track is mute
for the home video release.

References

External links 
 
 

1970s American animated television series
1970s American musical comedy television series
1970s American black cartoons
1970s British black cartoons
American Broadcasting Company original programming
1971 American television series debuts
1972 American television series endings
American children's animated comedy television series
American children's animated musical television series
The Jackson 5
Topcraft
Animation based on real people
Television series based on singers and musicians
Cultural depictions of Michael Jackson
Rankin/Bass Productions television series
Television series by Halas and Batchelor